Saima Noor is a Pakistani actress who appears in Pakistani films and television dramas. She rose to prominence after starring in the film Choorian (1998), which is regarded as one of the highest-grossing Pakistani films of all time. Some of her other notable film credits include Buddha Gujjar (2002), Majajan (2006), and Bhai Log (2011), all of which were commercial successes. She was one of country's leading film actresses during the 1990s and early 2000s.

Saima's film work spans many genres, including the supernatural film Naag aur Nagin (2005) and the biographical film Salute (2016). She has also established a career in the Pakistani television industry and has appeared in various television series, including Rang Laaga (2015), Yeh Mera Deewanapan Hai (2015), and Babban Khala Ki Betiyann (2018–2019).

In 2005, she married director Syed Noor with whom she has worked on a number of films.

Early life 
Saima was born in Multan, Punjab, Pakistan. She belongs to a Pathan family.

Career

Film career 
Saima was introduced to the film industry by Nagina Khanum, making her debut in the 1987 film Griban. She then starred in her second film, Khatarnaak, which was directed by Akram Khan. During her early years in film industry, she was mostly paired opposite actor Sultan Rahi in Punjabi films, but was recognized as a leading actress when filmmaker Syed Noor launched her career in Urdu films. Her biggest commercial success came out in 1998 when she starred in the musical-romantic film Choorian which gathered a total amount of roughly Rs. 200 million and became the highest grossing Punjabi-language film in Pakistan, thus establishing her as a leading actress of Lollywood. She portrayed the second lead role of Tanya in the acclaimed revenge thriller film Khilona which had Meera and Saud in leading roles. In 2000, she played the character of a fearless girl in the film Jungle Queen, who is a female Tarzan-type living in the jungle, swings on vines, rides elephants, etc. It was directed by her husband Syed Noor. In 2005, she appeared as a serpent in  the supernatural-fantasy film Naag aur Nagin. In 2011, she played the role of Munniya in the action film Bhai Log, which was a moderate box-office success, earning over Rs. 9.7 million in the first three days of its release. 

In 2012, she was paired opposite Shaan in the family film Shareeka, which had a decent opening on the box-office, accumulating over Rs. 3 million alone on the first three days of screening. Saima has also appeared in a biographical drama film called Salute which was based upon the life of Aitzaz Hasan.

In 2022, she worked in the Punjabi film Tere Bajre Di Rakhi.

Television 
Apart from films, she has also appeared in a number of television series, including Rang Laaga, Kaneez, Ye Mera Deewanapan Hai, and Mubarak Ho Beti Hui Hai. In 2018, she was signed opposite Sarmad Khoosat in the drama series Lamhay.

Personal life
Despite being romantically linked to Syed Noor, it was not officially revealed that whether she had married him or not. In 2007, during a press conference, Saima publicly stated that she married Syed Noor in July 2005, during the making of their mutual film Majajan.

In 2018, some media publications and online websites reported that Syed Noor had divorced Saima and the two are living separately. However, the couple denied these rumours and released a short clip on social media stating that they are happily married and will never separate.

In the media 
Saima was one of the most popular and leading film actresses in Pakistan during the 1990s and early 2000s. In 2017, The Express Tribune published an article on the topic of the lack of new heroines in the revival of Lollywood, in which Saima was cited as being lucky for the industry as she belongs to Southern Punjab. Film critic Omair Alavi from The News International praised her acting credibility and wrote that, "You can see why directors have continued to cast her over the years". In 2010, BBC News dubbed her as the "reigning queen of Pakistan's silver screen" and noted that she is "now one of the biggest names in the industry".

After the decline of Pakistani film industry, Saima made her television debut and went on to become one of the highest-paid actresses in television along with actress Resham who was her contemporary from the 1990s.

Selected filmography

Television

Accolades

See also 
 List of Lollywood actors

References

External links
 

Living people
People from Multan
Pakistani film actresses
Nigar Award winners
20th-century Pakistani actresses
21st-century Pakistani actresses
Punjabi people
1967 births